The Jolly Blue is a cargo ship operated by Messina Line between Tunis, Gioia, Tauro and Naples. It was previously operated by Toll Shipping and Brambles Shipping in Australia as the Victorian Reliance.

History
The Jolly Blue was built by Samsung Heavy Industries as the Victorian Reliance for Brambles Shipping for use on Bass Strait services between Melbourne and Burnie, along with sister ship Tasmanian Achiever. The ship was acquired by Toll Shipping with the Brambles shipping business in 2002.

It was extended by 32 metres to 184 metres in Singapore in 2004. When CMA CGM, parent company of Australian National Line, withdrew the Bass Trader from the Melbourne to Bell Bay route in 2009, it entered into a joint venture to transfer cargo to the Toll ships. As such it carried both Toll and ANL logos.

In March 2019, it was replaced by the larger Victorian Reliance II. It briefly returned to service while repairs were performed on Victorian Reliance II. It was sold in 2020 to Messina Line, renamed Jolly Blue and began operating on the Mediterranean Sea between Tunis, Gioia, Tauro and Naples.

References

External links

Container ships
Ro-ro ships
Ships built by Samsung Heavy Industries
Ships built in Geoje
Toll Group
1999 ships